The 131st Boat Race took place on 6 April 1985.  Held annually, the event is a side-by-side rowing race between crews from the Universities of Oxford and Cambridge along the River Thames.  Oxford won by  lengths. Bruce Philp became the first man to row for both universities having previously rowed for Cambridge, and Henrietta Shaw became the first female cox for Cambridge.

Isis won the reserve race, while Oxford were victorious in the Women's Boat Race.

Background
The Boat Race is a side-by-side rowing competition between the University of Oxford (sometimes referred to as the "Dark Blues") and the University of Cambridge (sometimes referred to as the "Light Blues").  First held in 1829, the race takes place on the  Championship Course on the River Thames in southwest London.  The rivalry is a major point of honour between the two universities and followed throughout the United Kingdom and broadcast worldwide.  Oxford went into the race as reigning champions, having beaten Cambridge by  lengths in the previous year's race.  However Cambridge held the overall lead, with 68 victories to Oxford's 61 (excluding the "dead heat" of 1877).  The race was sponsored by Ladbrokes for the ninth consecutive year.

The first Women's Boat Race took place in 1927, but did not become an annual fixture until the 1960s. Until 2014, the contest was conducted as part of the Henley Boat Races, but as of the 2015 race, it is held on the River Thames, on the same day as the men's main and reserve races.  The reserve race, contested between Oxford's Isis boat and Cambridge's Goldie boat has been held since 1965.  It usually takes place on the Tideway, prior to the main Boat Race.

Crews
Oxford's crew contained four former Blues while Cambridge featured three. Bruce Philp became the first man to row for both universities, having represented Cambridge in the 1982 and 1983 races. Henrietta Shaw became the first woman to cox the Cambridge boat.

Race

Cambridge won the toss and elected to start from the Surrey station.  A quick start from Cambridge coupled with a poor one from Oxford saw the Light Blues take a third of a length lead before being reined back at Fulham Football Club.  A one-second lead at the mile post preceded a period of warnings from umpire Ronnie Howard to both coxes as they contested the same water. Oxford held a canvas' lead as the crews passed under Hammersmith Bridge and began to move away along Chiswick Eyot.  A ten-second lead at Barnes Bridge became a thirteen-second lead at the finishing post, as Oxford took the win by four and three-quarter lengths in a time of 17 minutes 11 seconds. This was Oxford's tenth consecutive victory, and their eleventh in twelve years, and took the overall record to 68–62 in favour of Cambridge.

In the reserve race, Oxford's Isis beat Cambridge's Goldie by six lengths, while Oxford won the 40th Women's Boat Race.

Reaction
Cambridge stroke John Pritchard said "I tried everything.  But at the vital moment, the boat went heavy." His Oxford counterpart Francis Reininger said "I was always optimistic that the power was there waiting to be switched on.  When I asked for it, it glowed." Oxford coach Dan Topolski suggested that being given the Middlesex station was to their advantage, "I was glad to have Middlesex because in training our first three minutes had always been relatively poor."

References

External links
 Official website

The Boat Race
1985 in English sport
1985 in rowing
April 1985 sports events in the United Kingdom
1985 sports events in London